North Solapur Taluka is one of the 11 tehsils of Solapur District in the Indian state of Maharashtra. This tehsil is located in the eastern side of district and is bordered by Osmanabad District to the northeast, South Solapur to the south and east, Barshi Taluka to the north and Mohol Taluka to the west. The tehsil headquarters is located at Solapur, which is also the district headquarters and its largest city.

As of 2001, the tehsil population was 960,803

References

External links
The official website of Solapur district
North Solapur Tehsil on Biond
Solapurmajha Online local Directory

Talukas in Solapur district